Ergolding (Central Bavarian: Erwading) is a municipality in the district of Landshut, in Bavaria, Germany. It is situated on the left bank of the Isar, 5 km northeast of Landshut.

References

Landshut (district)